M. Idris Judge of the High Court of Bangladesh who was the first Chief Election Commissioner of Bangladesh.

Career 
Idris was appointed the Chief Election Commissioner of Bangladesh on 7 July 1972 and served until 6 July 1977. The first general election of 7 March 1972 was held under his commission.

References 

Chief Election Commissioners of Bangladesh
Bangladeshi judges

Possibly living people
Year of birth missing